Victoria Hill (born 18 February 1971 in Adelaide) is an Australian actress, writer and producer. She is now based between Los Angeles, New York City and Sydney.

Early life and career
Victoria Hill is the daughter of Robert Hill, a former politician, diplomat and Chancellor of the University of Adelaide; and Diana Hill, the Australian president of UNICEF.

A graduate of Flinders University Drama Centre, she spent many years performing in theatre productions in Adelaide and interstate before winning her first part in a feature film, 1999's Dead End, soon followed by a role in Siam Sunset. Hill spent subsequent years performing on stage and in occasional television roles until her film career took off in 2006, with roles in Modern Love, Hunt Angels, BoyTown, December Boys and Macbeth, the Shakespeare adaptation which she also co-wrote and -produced. In 2018, she appeared in the Paul Schrader-directed film First Reformed, which she also co-produced.

Selected filmography

References

External links 

Macbeth official web site

Australian film actresses
Living people
1974 births
Actresses from Adelaide
UNICEF Goodwill Ambassadors
Flinders University alumni